Nitidine is a benzophenanthridine alkaloid found in species of the genus Zanthoxylum , notably in Zanthoxylum nitidum. This compound has an anti-malarial activity.

References 

Isoquinoline alkaloids
Benzodioxoles
Quinoline alkaloids
Alkaloids found in Rutaceae
Antimalarial agents